IHRA Drag Racing: Sportsman Edition is a 2006 video game published by Bethesda Softworks.

Development
The game was announced in May 2005 with a release date of Q3 2005.

Reception

TeamXbox gave the Xbox version of the game a rating of 3 of 10 stating" Unless you’re that one extraordinarily diehard drag racing fan that’s out there, chances are this game won’t exactly light your fire. Pass on this for any of the other wonderful racing experiences that the Xbox already has in its library."

References

2006 video games
Bethesda Softworks games
PlayStation 2 games
Racing video games
Video games developed in the United States
Windows games
Xbox games
Gamebryo games